KVMD (channel 31) is a television station in Twentynine Palms, California, United States, affiliated with NTD Television. Station owner Ronald Ulloa is also president and majority owner of Rancho Palos Verdes-licensed independent station KXLA (channel 44). KVMD's studios are located on Corinth Avenue (near Interstate 405) in West Los Angeles, and its transmitter is located atop Snow Peak in the San Bernardino Mountains, north of Banning, California; its broadcast signal covers most of the area within the Inland Empire.

KVMD's signal is relayed by two low-power translators: KSMV-LD in Los Angeles and KIMG-LD in Ventura, both of which also broadcast on digital channel 23 and virtual channel 31. The station is carried throughout the Los Angeles media market on various cable television systems. KVMD-DT is also available on DirecTV and Dish Network on channel 31, its former analog channel.

The station broadcasts digitally on 10 subchannels. KVMD is dedicated to providing free over-the-air programming to minority groups in southern California. Currently, programming is offered in English, Spanish, Mandarin Chinese, Vietnamese and Armenian.

History
On December 1, 1997, KVMD launched on analog channel 31 with America One programming. Its original analog signal was weak and could not generally be received beyond Twentynine Palms and Yucca Valley. However, it sought and obtained carriage on many cable systems throughout Southern California, as well as satellite TV, due to its location on the outskirts of the Los Angeles DMA and Federal Communications Commission (FCC) must-carry rules.

On July 29, 2002, its digital signal went on the air on channel 23. This signal is much stronger, potentially reaching 80 times as many viewers over the air as its analog signal, and covering most of the Inland Empire. It also reaches much of Los Angeles, Orange and northern San Diego counties.

On June 1, 2003, KVMD became the first station in the country to shut off its analog channel and go digital-only, in support of the government-mandated digital transition.

On June 1, 2008, KVMD started to air ARTN Armenian programming every night. On August 31, 2017, KVMD discontinued ARTN programming and moved to cable-only; KVMD also switched to Almavision programming.

In December 2017, it was announced that the station will become the Los Angeles market's LATV affiliate on January 1, 2018, replacing KJLA, which became the market's new Azteca América affiliate.

On July 1, 2021, KVMD replaced its affiliation with LATV on its main channel with New Tang Dynasty Television (NTD). The former LATV affiliation moved to its fifth subchannel.

Subchannels
The station's digital signal is multiplexed:

Translators

References

External links 
Official website
"L.A. DTV Spat Could be a Test Case", Multichannel News, December 16, 2002
2006 FCC petition requesting mandatory carriage under "must-carry" rules

VMD
Television channels and stations established in 1997
1997 establishments in California
VMD
VMD
LATV affiliates